Hole is a surname. Notable individuals with the surname include:

People
 Barrie Hole (1942-2019), Welsh international footballer and son of Billy Hole
Billy Hole (1897-1983), Welsh international footballer and father of Barrie Hole
  Brandon Scott Hole (2001-2021), American spree killer and perpetrator of the 2021 Indianapolis FedEx shooting
 Christopher Hole (1511-1570), English politician. 
 Dave Hole (born 1948), Australian slide guitarist
Frank Hole (born 1931), American archaeologist
 Fred Hole (1935–2011), English art director
 Graeme Hole (1931–1990), Australian cricketer
 Harry Hole (1855–1942), New Zealand cricketer
 Hugh Marshall Hole, CMG (1865–1941), English pioneer, administrator and author
 Joanna Hole (born 1955), British actress
 Jonathan Hole (1904–1998), American actor
 Jean Hole (born 1925 - 2011) British palaeontologist known for discovering the Dune shearwater
 Kevin Hole, Australian rugby league footballer who played in the 1950s and 1960s
 Lois Hole (c.1929 – 2005), Canadian politician and author
 Martin Hole (born 1959), Norwegian cross-country skier
 Max Hole (born 1951), chairman and CEO of UMGI
 Michael Hole (1941–1976), British-born horse racing jockey who mainly raced in USA
 Mickey Hole (1892–1969), NFL player
 Nina Hole (1941–2016), Danish artist
 Njål Hole MBE (1914–1988), Norwegian chemical engineer and nuclear physicist
 Samuel Hole (1819–1904), English Anglican priest, author and horticulturalist
 Sigurd Hole (born 1981), Norwegian jazz musician
 Stian Hole (born 1969), Norwegian graphic designer, illustrator and writer of children's books
 Stuart Hole (born 1985), former English cricketer
 Tahu Hole CBE (1908–1985), New Zealand born journalist
 William Brassey Hole (1846–1917), English artist
 Willits J. Hole (1858–1936), American businessman and real estate developer in Southern California

Fictional characters
 Harry Hole, fictional Norwegian detective

See also
 Einar Hole Moxnes (1921–2006), Norwegian politician for the Centre Party